Maurice Moscovich (born Morris Maaskov; November 23, 1871 – June 18, 1940) was a Russian American actor who was well-known for his roles in Yiddish theatre. His 14 films, which he made at the end of his life, include Charlie Chaplin's The Great Dictator.

Life and career 
Maurice Moscovich was born Morris Maaskov in Odessa, Tsarist Russia. He emigrated to the United States no later than 1897 and performed for decades in the Yiddish theatre in New York and appeared in two 1930 Broadway plays.

In the last four years of his life, Moscovitch played supporting roles in 14 films. With his distinctive accent, he portrayed mostly wise and friendly old men, often with Jewish background. He played a shopkeeper in the highly praised Make Way for Tomorrow (1937) and the art dealer Maurice Cobert in Love Affair (1939) with Irene Dunne and Charles Boyer. His last film was Charlie Chaplin's Hitler-satire The Great Dictator, in which he played the Barber's friendly Jewish neighbour, Mr. Jaeckel, who flees into exile to his brother.

Maurice Moskovich died at the age of 68, following surgery. At the time of his death, he was playing the role of a dancing master in Dance, Girl, Dance. His role had to be quickly rewritten for actress Maria Ouspenskaya. He is buried with his wife Rose (1872–1944) at the Beth Olam Cemetery in Hollywood. The couple had three sons, including actor Noel Madison (1897-1975).

Filmography

References

External links 

 
 

1871 births
1940 deaths
American male film actors
20th-century American male actors
Emigrants from the Russian Empire to the United States
American people of Russian-Jewish descent
Jewish American male actors